The 1983–84 AHL season was the 48th season of the American Hockey League. Thirteen teams played 80 games each in the schedule. The league initiates two new awards. The Aldege "Baz" Bastien Memorial Award is first awarded to the league's "best goaltender." The Jack A. Butterfield Trophy is first awarded to the "MVP of the playoffs." The Baltimore Skipjacks finished first overall in the regular season. The Maine Mariners won their third Calder Cup championship.

Final standings
Note: GP = Games played; W = Wins; L = Losses; T = Ties; GF = Goals for; GA = Goals against; Pts = Points;

Scoring leaders

Note: GP = Games played; G = Goals; A = Assists; Pts = Points; PIM = Penalty minutes

 complete list

Calder Cup playoffs

Details from hockeyDB

Trophy and award winners
Team awards

Individual awards

Other awards

See also
List of AHL seasons

References
AHL official site
AHL Hall of Fame
HockeyDB

 
2
2
American Hockey League seasons